Maunatlala is a village in Central District of Botswana at the feet of the Tswapong Hills, near the Lotsane River. The population was 4,364 in 2011 census.
The village is the site of the Lotsane Dam, which started impounding in January 2012 and supplies drinking water as well
as water for irrigation in a  horticulture operation near Maunatlala.

School

It has three schools, two primary schools and a junior school. It also has a library that was opened in 2015. The primary schools are Masupe Primary School and Maunatlala Primary school. Its junior school also called Maunatlala Junior Secondary school. It offers form 1 up to form 3 classes. All of the schools are government owned. There are also numerous day care centres around the village including a pre-school/pre-classes at Maunatlala primary school.

Sports

There are many football clubs in Maunatlala. There is Dinare Fc, Maunatlala United, Kopung Saints, Silver Stars fc, FC Hollywood, Lotsane fc and River Stones fc. The biggest teams are Dinare fc and Maunatlala United. They normally face each other on high tempo games during holidays especially during the MAGODIMO festive season tournaments. There are also several clubs for other sporting codes like volleyball and netball. In volleyball there is Zone 14.

Shops

There are a couple of shops around the village mainly general dealers. There also numerous tuckshops (dimausu) around the village. There is equator general dealer which is right in the centre of the village, Mophane general dealer, Sesigo General dealer, Banana General dealer, Sikwa General dealer, Mmadinare general dealer (near the kgotla) and Rrabele. There are also some Chinese shops and a hardware (Bafana Hardware). There also the market which is owned and controlled by the village development committee. Couple of tuckshops around the village include Ga-mma masedise, sejo sennye, dilo-makwati and many more.

References

Populated places in Central District (Botswana)
Villages in Botswana